Egyetemváros (literally: University Town) is the part of Miskolc, Hungary where the buildings of the University of Miskolc stand.

Its area is approximately 850.000 m2 and can be found between the Avas hill and Miskolctapolca. It was designated in February 1950 as the place for the university which was being moved from Sopron to Miskolc.

The main buildings of the university, the library, the canteen, the dormitories and the sports facilities can be found in University Town, surrounded by a large park.

Not all of the institutions of the university are to be found in this district. The college of Dunaújváros was a faculty of the university between 1969 and 2000. The Comenius Teacher's College, which became a faculty of the university in 2000, is in Sárospatak.

The Béla Bartók Music Institute, which joined the university in 1997, resides in the Palace of Music in the downtown, while the Imre Hajnal Health Institute (founded in 2001) is in Hejőcsaba.

External links
 Map of University Town on the website of the university

Neighbourhoods of Miskolc